This is a list of notable alumni and faculty of the University of North Carolina at Charlotte.

Academia, science and technology
Benjamin Chavis, civil rights activist, head of NAACP
Glenda Gilmore, Peter and C. Vann Woodward Professor of History, Yale University 
Jill S. Tietjen, electrical engineer and consultant
Greg Gbur, author and physicist
Shane Wighton, engineer and YouTube personality for Stuff Made Here

Arts and literature
Amanda Oleander, fine artist (2013)

Music
Clay Aiken, singer, Broadway star, and 1st runner-up of the second season of American Idol
Nicole Atkins, pop singer (2001)
Seth Avett, musician, of The Avett Brothers (2002)
Chris Lane, musician, of the Chris Lane Band
The Moody Brothers, Grammy-nominated musicians
Dave Moody, Dove Award-winning artist, producer, songwriter and indie filmmaker

Athletics

Eddie Basden, Chicago Bulls guard/forward (2005)
Duggar Baucom, Citadel Bulldogs head basketball coach (1995)
Calvin Brock, heavyweight boxer (1999)
Jon Busch, Columbus Crew goalkeeper (1996)
Cameron Clark (American football), NFL player for the New York Jets
Fieldin Culbreth, former Major League Baseball umpire
Jon Davis (basketball), professional basketball player for the KK EuroNickel 2005
Nate Davis (offensive lineman), NFL player for the Tennessee Titans
Floyd Franks, Chicago Fire midfielder (2006)
Leemire Goldwire, professional basketball player (May 2008)
Bryan Harvey, California Angels and Florida Marlins pitcher
Alex Highsmith, NFL player for the Pittsburgh Steelers
DeMarco Johnson, professional basketball player (1997)
Bobby Lutz, Charlotte 49ers head basketball coach (1980)
John Maine, New York Mets pitcher
Cedric Maxwell, NBA great with the Boston Celtics and commentator (1983) (attended 1973–1977)
Kelly Earnhardt Miller, NASCAR owner
Benny Moss, UNC Wilmington head basketball coach (1992)
Larry Ogunjobi, NFL player for the Cleveland Browns
Joe Posnanski, national columnist at NBC Sports, New York Times best-selling author
Myatt Snider, NASCAR driver NASCAR Xfinity Series for joe Gibbs Racing
Melvin Watkins, head basketball coach at Charlotte and Texas A&M (1977)
Rodney White, professional basketball player (2001)
Donnie Smith, professional soccer player (2013–2018)

Business and law
R. Andrew Murray, US Attorney for the Western District of North Carolina
Robert A. Niblock, Lowe's Chairman, President, and CEO (1984)
Anne Tompkins, former US Attorney for the Western District of North Carolina

Politics and public life
Mike Davis, California State Assemblyman (2006-2012); President Pro Tem, Los Angeles Board of Public Works Commission
Dan Forest, Lt. Governor of North Carolina (1993)
Richard Hudson, United States House of Representatives North Carolina's 8th congressional district (1996)
Lillian M. Lowery, Superintendent of the Maryland State Department of Education

Miscellaneous

Kimberly Clarice Aiken, Miss America 1994 (attended; did not graduate)
Heather Childers, Fox News weekend anchor
Chelsea Cooley, Miss USA 2005 (attended; did not graduate)
Joe Posnanski, 2011 NSSA Sportswriter of the Year

Notable UNC Charlotte faculty

Social science, arts and humanities
Blaine E. Brownell, Director of the School of Architecture and author of the Transmaterial book series (2006-2017)
Blair Rudes, professor of linguistics; re-created the extinct language of Virginian Algonquian for Terrence Malick's 2005 film The New World
James D. Tabor, Religious Studies Chair, designated occult expert in the case of Waco, Texas; author of the international bestseller The Jesus Dynasty

Science and technology
Kathy Reichs, bestselling author; inspiration of the Fox television drama Bones
Raphael Tsu, physicist known for his research in man-made quantum materials, superlattices, and quantum wells

References

University of North Carolina at Charlotte alumni

de:University of North Carolina at Charlotte
fr:Université de North Carolina at Charlotte
nl:Universiteit van North Carolina at Charlotte